Farrell Lines Incorporated was a boat company named in 1948 after James A. Farrell, Jr., and John J. Farrell, sons of James Augustine Farrell, president of US Steel. The company was previously known as American South African Lines (ASAL). It was a passenger line and cargo line in regular service from New York City to South Africa stopping at Cape Town, Port Elizabeth, Durban and Lourenço Marques (Maputo) in Mozambique.   The ships were well-appointed and carried about 180 passengers.

Flag
In heraldic terms, the house flag is field per saltire red and blue, overlaid by a white saltire.

Original routes
1925 New York to West Africa, South Africa
1935 New York to East Africa
1965 U.S. East Coast to Australia and New Zealand
1975 U.S. West Coast to Australia and New Zealand

Ships funnel
The ships funnel (smokestack)
1925 - 1946 Buff 
1946 - 2000 Buff  with black  top and depiction of houseflag

Reporting mark
FRLU
Note: Marks ending in U are for container owners.

History

The heritage and shipping prowess of Farrell Lines can be traced back to the early 1900s when James A. Farrell Sr., the late president of the United States Steel Corporation, established his own steamship company. The Isthmian Steamship Company was created in 1910 as a subsidiary of U.S. Steel and was designed to mitigate the costs of shipping U.S. Steel's freight. James A. Farrell grew up the son of a ship's captain, and the knowledge he acquired aided him in establishing a shipping legacy.

Farrell's foray into the shipping industry was a great success. He saved U.S. Steel Corporation substantial sums of money and ultimately decided to delve even further into this new enterprise. By 1928, Farrell was involved in several shipping ventures and operated three of the most influential companies in the industry: Argonaut Lines, Robin Lines, and the American South African Lines (ASAL).

James A. Farrell Sr. had two sons to whom he imparted his shipping knowledge and business savvy. Both sons, John and James Jr., went on to operate two of the three major shipping investments. James Jr. was president of ASAL while John was principal stockholder and president of Argonaut Lines.

In 1940, John abolished Argonaut Lines and transferred its vessels to ASAL. Shortly thereafter, James Jr. served in World War II in Naval Intelligence, and upon returning home, he teamed up with his brother to run ASAL. The two were able to create a powerful management team and operated the main U.S. flag and passenger service between Africa and the United States.

By 1948, ASAL was the only line operated by the Farrell family and the name was subsequently changed to Farrell Lines. Determined to leave their imprint on the family legacy, the Farrell brothers worked tirelessly to improve their brand and position the company for growth. In 1965, they acquired the Australia-U.S. East Coast service from United States Lines. At this time the brothers also ceased offering passenger services, fixing their focus entirely onto the movement of cargo.

Following their 1965 acquisition, growth came along rapidly, and in the early 1970s the company began the transition to containerized cargo handling. Farrell Lines purchased another string of companies in 1975, including the West-Coast Australia Service of the Pacific Far East Line. By 1978 Farrell Lines had become the second largest U.S.-flag merchant fleet, 44 ships, with the acquisition of the entire American Export Lines fleet, including two container ships under construction or on order at Bath Iron Works, the Argonaut and Resolute.

When James Jr. and John died in 1978 and 1968, respectively, they had made Farrell Lines a top-tier U.S. flag company. They had upheld their father's legacy and ultimately handed the company down to other members of the Farrell family. But difficult financial times hit the company, and Farrell Lines dropped all of its African and European routes and sold 38 of its 44 ships. By 1991, Farrell Lines continued to operate with only four ships and catered solely to the Mediterranean and Persian Gulf.

Sale
Farrell Lines became a subsidiary of P&O Nedlloyd Container Line Ltd. in 2000, which was subsequently purchased by the A.P. Møller-Maersk Group in 2005. Following the purchase, Farrell Lines became a part of Maersk Line, Limited, the U.S. flag operating arm of the A.P. Møller-Maersk Group. Under Maersk Line, Limited, Farrell Lines has reemerged as a U.S. flag roll-on, roll-off carrier. Maersk Line, Limited revitalized the Farrell Lines brand in 2010 and increased the fleet to four ships.

Farrell Lines currently operates in partnership with Höegh Autoliners and its U.S. affiliate Alliance Navigation, focusing their efforts on transits between the U.S. East Coast and the Gulf of Mexico to the Middle East and Southwest Asia. Farrell Lines has also been able to sustain its tradition of leadership by participating in the Maritime Security Program (MSP) and the Voluntary Intermodal Sealift Agreement (VISA); both are important programs designed to support the Department of Defense in its sustainment of U.S. military forces to ensure the fleet is prepared in the event that emergency deployment is needed.

Farrell Lines International
Farrell Lines International owned by Farrell Lines Inc. was a Liberian Company with offices at the Farrell House, Monrovia, Liberia. It existed from the 1950s until the First Liberian Civil War, which started in 1988. The Company's Feeder Fleet operated four coastal vessels registered in Liberia. Three were designed by Sparkman & Stevens and built by the John H. Mathis & Company, Camden, New Jersey. They were the M/V Kpo, M/V Farmington and the M/V Cestos built in the 1950s by John H. Mathis & Company, Shipbuilders.  The M/V Cavalla was a converted U. S. Navy landing ship. They were delivered to Africa on their own bottoms which took approximately thirty days. These ships were designed to have good seagoing qualities and maneuverability so that they could cross a dangerous bar on their regular run. The Officers were licensed and the crew well trained to navigate the coastal waters and rivers of West Africa. These ships brought supplies to the Firestone Natural Rubber plantation in Harbel, Liberia, as well as cargo to be flown inland by the Liberian National Airways at Robert's Field. Since she had cargo handling gear, the M/V Kpo also made regular runs to other undeveloped ports including Cape Palmas. On their return to Monrovia they carried baled rubber as well as latex for trans-shipment to the United States. Having been a Harbor Pilot for the Port of Monrovia and the Captain of ships in the Farrell Feeder Fleet, I have first hand knowledge of these facts. Additional resources include Sparkman & Stevens designs 864 and 920 and the John H. Mathis & Co. Shipbuilders web site.

Current fleet
The Farrell Line fleet currently consists of three pure car/truck carriers built by Daewoo Shipbuilding & Marine Engineering Co., Ltd. In February 2010, Farrell Lines expanded its U.S. flag fleet with larger vessels to meet customers' growing demand.

The Alliance Beaumont and Alliance Charleston, which have adjustable deck configurations to optimize space and maximize militarily useful stowage, joined the Alliance St. Louis and Alliance Norfolk. 

The Alliance Beaumont and Alliance Charleston went to Leif Höegh & Co to the fleet of Höegh Autoliners and renamed as Höegh Tokyo  and Höegh London  respectfully and the Alliance Fairfax joined the Farrell Line Fleet 2013.

Farrell Lines New York office
Farrell Lines fourteenth floor office at its downtown Manhattan location was full of ship models and paintings of ships. Behind the receptionist, as you came in the door, there was a world map with chains of white lights showing the various trade routes served by Farrell Lines ships.  The world was illuminated by the white lights across the Atlantic, Pacific, the Mediterranean and the Indian Oceans.

John J. Farrell used to stop by before the Christmas holiday and distributed a two-week holiday check to each employee in both good times and bad. Families were a topic John cherished dearly. John was deeply saddened by the loss of his younger brother James many years earlier.

The company's maps and other items display a shield with the company's flag under a ship surrounded by two sea-horses on each side above sea waves. The ship depicted in the official logo, was the SS Tusitalia, the last US flag commercial vessel powered by sails, yet the first to be assisted by a steam engine.

Vessels

 Argonaut Lines
Atlantic
Charles H. Cramp
Henry S. Grove
Lancaster
Pacific
Sagadahoc
 United States Shipping Board
Challenger
Eastern Glade
Eastern Glen

West Isleta
West Cheswald
Western Knight
 War Shipping Administration-Owner (ASAL)Operator
SS Samuel Ashe
SS Bernard Carter
Chincha
SS Jeremiah M. Daily
SS Minnie M. Fiske
Daniel Morgan
SS Henry St. George Tucker
Escabana Victory (USS Regulus (AF-57)
SS Maritime Victory
SS George Washington Carver
William Hopper
Farrell Lines Steamship Inc
CV Argonaut
CV Resolute
African Comet (1)
African Comet (2)
African Dawn
African Dawn (2)
African Endeavor
 (photo)
African Enterprise
 (photo)
(photo)
African Glade
African Glen
African Grove
African Lightning
African Meteor (1)
African Meteor (2)
African Mercury
African Moon
African Neptune
African Patriot
African Pilgrim
African Pilot
African Planet (1)
African Planet (2)
African Rainbow
African Star (1)
African Star (2)
African Sun
Alliance Beaumont
(photo)
Alliance Charleston
Alliance Norfolk
(photo)
Alliance St. Louis
Austral Endurance
Austral Energy
Austral Ensign
Austral Entente
Austral Envoy
Austral Glen
Austral Lighting
Austral Moon
Austral Patriot
Austral Pilgrim
Austral Pilot
Austral Pioneer
Austral Puritan
Austral Rainbow
Australian Gem
Australian Gulf
Australian Surf
City of New York
(photo)
Highlands
James A. Farrell
Manderson Victory
Richard Bland
Soubarissen
Farrell Lines International:
M/V Kpo
M/V Farmington
M/V Cestos
M/V Cavalla
American Export Lines
CV Lightning
CV Staghound
Defiance
Export Adventurer
Export Agent
Export Aide
Export Ambassador
Export Banner
Export Bay
Export Builder
Export Buyer
Export Challenger
Export Champion
Export Commerce
Export Courier
Export Defender
Export Democracy
Export Diplomat
Four Aces
Export Freedom
Export Leader
Export Patriot
Great Republic
Red Jacket
Young America

See also
Atlantic, Gulf and Pacific Steamship Company
Federal Shipbuilding and Drydock Company
(Search for American South African Line)
List of Empire ships (B)
List of Empire ships (I-J)
List of Empire ships (M)
List of shipwrecks in March 1942

Ships gallery

References

External links

 The return of Farrell Lines
 A historical dictionary of the U.S. merchant marine and shipping industry: since the introduction of steam by René De La Pedraja Tomán
 Farrell Lines Fleet
  Farrell Lines Ship List
 Farrell Lines by Joe Mcmillan
 American Export Ship List
 Design of Austral Endurance, Ensign, Entente and Envoy
 Merchant Ship Building History
 Merchant Ships Used in the Korean War
 NYT Travel 1982
 C/V Export Patriot
 African Neptune
 Maritime Images
 Port of Houston Magazine October 1982
 Old Ships picture gallaries
 Rowayton Historical society
 Sagadahoc - Ships hit by U-boats
 Convoy PQ17 merchants
 Pacific
 Designs of Comet, Meteor, Planet and Enterprise
Uboat Net

Shipping companies of the United States
Maersk Line